Bothrops Insularis, commonly known as the Golden Lancehead, is a highly venomous pit viper species endemic to Ilha da Queimada Grande, off the coast of São Paulo state, in Brazil. The species is named for the light yellowish-brown color of its underside and for its head shape that is characteristic of the genus Bothrops. No subspecies of Bothrops insularis are currently recognized. It is one of the most venomous snakes in Latin America.

Physical morphology

Size and appearance
The color pattern consists of a pale yellowish-brown ground color, overlaid with a series of dorsal blotches that may be triangular or quadrangular, broad or narrow, and alternating or opposite along the dorsal median. In captivity, this yellowish color often becomes darker, which may be the result of poor circulation caused by ineffective thermoregulation. A banded pattern results when the pattern is opposite. The head lacks a well-defined post-orbital stripe. The belly is a uniform pale yellow or cream.
The name "lancehead" refers to the distinctive head shape of all snakes in the genus Bothrops, which is somewhat elongated and comes to a point at the nose. B. insularis also has a longer tail than its closest relative, B. jararaca, which is most likely an adaptation to help the snake maneuver through the trees, and to eat larger prey like birds from a younger age.

Venom
Because of the isolated habitat of B. insularis, and the lack of mammal prey species, the venom of B. insularis has evolved to be adapted to the prey species of the island, primarily native ectotherms, arthropods and migrating birds. As a result, their venom is more potent towards these groups than mammals, and becomes more potent as the snake matures. Chemical analysis of the venom of B. insularis suggests that it is five times as potent as that of B. jararaca and is the fastest acting venom in the genus Bothrops.

Because B. insularis is only found in an area uninhabited by humans, there has never been an official report of a human being bitten by one, but other lanceheads are responsible for more human mortality than any other group of snakes in either North or South America. Ludwig Trutnau reports four human envenomations, three of which were fatal. The mortality rate for lancehead envenomations is 0.5–3% if the patient receives treatment and 7% if the patient does not receive treatment. The effects of envenomations by golden lanceheads include swelling, local pain, nausea and vomiting, blood blisters, bruising, blood in the vomit and urine, intestinal bleeding, kidney failure, hemorrhage in the brain and severe necrosis of muscular tissue.

Reproduction
Sexually mature Bothrops insularis mate during August and September, and have been known to mate both in the trees and on the ground. Like most vipers, B. insularis gives live birth to its young. The average size for a litter of golden lanceheads is 6.5 newborns. There are no published data for the size of the golden lancehead at birth, but they are probably of a similar size to Bothrops jararaca, which have a snout to vent length (SVL) of 24.5 to 25.3 cm (about 9¾ in) and a weight of 9.38 to 10.61 grams (about ⅓ ounce).

Owing to the dependence of B. insularis on migratory birds visiting the island as a food source, the reproductive cycle of female snakes has been suggested to be tied to seasonal bird migration patterns.

Geographic range
The species is endemic to Queimada Grande Island, Brazil, commonly known as Snake Island. Therefore, the type locality is the same: "Ilha da Queimada Grande, situado no litoral do Estado de S. Paulo, a cêrca de 40 milhas a S.O. da barra de Santos" (Brazil). This island has a total area of only 43 hectares or 430,000 square metres. Travel to the island is strictly prohibited by the Brazilian government.

Habitat
The island of Queimada Grande is what is classified as "subtropical" or "tropical moist forest". The island contains several different kinds of habitat including forest, clearings, and shrubs. The island has a very mild climate; the temperature never falls below 18 degrees Celsius, and at its hottest is just over 22 degrees Celsius (64 to 72 °F). Because of the extremely rocky terrain and the isolation of the island, however, the island is not easily accessible and is not populated by humans, or for that matter, any other mammal. The quality of its habitat continues to decline due to vegetation removal by members of the Brazilian Navy who maintain the lighthouse on the island.

Micro-habitat preferences
Bothrops insularis can usually be found either in the trees hunting for its prey, or seeking shelter among leaf litter or in rock crevices, especially during unfavorable weather or after having just ingested its prey.

Taxonomy and evolution
A 2005 genetic study found that the golden lancehead was nested within the living genetic diversity of Bothrops jararaca, a snake native to southern Brazil, Paraguay, and northern Argentina. It is thought that the golden lancehead descends from a population of B. jararaca that became isolated on Queimada Grande, which was connected to the South American mainland during the Last Glacial Period, after a major sea level rise at the beginning of the Holocene. Including B. insularis and B. jararaca, there are 37 species in the genus Bothrops, which are all native to South America. Besides "lancehead", another common name for a snake in the genus Bothrops is "fer-de-lance". There are no mammals native to the island Queimada Grande, which has undoubtedly had a profound impact on the evolution of the golden lancehead.

Ecology

Predators
In Campbell and Lamar's 2004 accounts of the venomous reptiles of Latin America, there was no mention of any predators that could potentially prey on an adult B. insularis. However, the list of animal species provided by Duarte et al. includes several species of birds, spiders, millipedes, and various lizards that inhabit the island, which could potentially be predators of young snakes. Of course, Duarte et al. also stress that there is a lack of observation of this species, due to the inaccessibility of the island Queimada Grande, and that just because a relationship between B. insularis and other species has not been observed does not mean that such a relationship does not exist.

Prey
The golden lancehead's diet consists mostly of perching birds. However, they have been reported to eat lizards, and even resort to cannibalism. Newborn and juvenile golden lanceheads prey primarily upon invertebrates. Adult B. insularis are able to survive off only one or two birds species per year of the more than 40 that visit the island.

Competition
Adult Bothrops insularis are the only animals on the island of Queimada Grande that have been reported to eat birds. There are other fauna, such as frogs, lizards, and birds, on the island that eat invertebrates, but because insects are so plentiful in ecosystems, they may not be a limiting resource. Therefore, studies would have to be done to determine whether or not juvenile and newborn golden lanceheads must compete for food with other fauna.

Parasites
Golden lanceheads are known to suffer from flukes (specifically Ochetosoma heterocoelium) in their mouth cavity as well as carry the hard-bodied tick Ambylomma rotundatum.

Conservation

Conservation status
This species is classified as critically endangered (CR) on the IUCN Red List for the following criteria: CR B1ab(iii)+2ab(iii) (v3.1 (2001). This means that the geographic range is estimated to be less than 100 km², that this area is severely fragmented or known to exist at only a single location, and that a continuing decline has been observed, inferred or projected for the area, extent and/or quality of the habitat. Furthermore, the area of occupancy is estimated to be less than 10 km². The population trend is stable. Year assessed: 2004. The population of B. insularis on the island was estimated in 2021 based on a combination of observations, 2D, and 3D scanning of the island in 2015, and estimated to be between 2,414 (2D scan estimate) and 2,899 (3D scan estimate).

Limited geographic distribution
Because the island on which the species is found is small, it can support only a small population, suggesting that the range between the number of snakes required for the population to survive and the maximum number the island can support is small, making the species especially sensitive to any other problems. Also, because the island of Queimada Grande is the only place where B. insularis is found in the wild, if that population is wiped out the species will be extinct in the wild.

Habitat destruction and over-collecting
In the past, people have deliberately started fires on the island of Queimada Grande in an attempt to kill off B. insularis so that the island could be used to grow bananas. The Brazilian Navy has also contributed to habitat destruction by removing vegetation in order to maintain a lighthouse on the island. Because of these problems as well as overharvesting by overzealous scientists, Duarte et al. wrote that it is "very hazardous to assume that this is an invulnerable snake". Based on a 100-year simulation, it was estimated that between 25 to 40 snakes harvested per year would cause genetic extinction for B. insularis. Collection of this species of snake is permitted only with a scientific collection permit.

In addition to authorized collecting for research purposes, the illegal wildlife trade is a threat to B. insularis due to its rare nature, with researchers approached with offers of up to $30,000 for specimens in 2008, nearly 4 times Brazil's GDP per capita that year.

Reproductive health and intersexes
Due to the small population and limited geographic distribution of B. insularis, there is a high level of inbreeding in the in situ population on the island. This threatens to produce deleterious genes in the population and is associated with extinction when inbreeding depression occurs in the population. Diversity management may be needed in the future for in situ and ex situ populations maintained off the island for research to avoid extinction.

Associated with the heavy inbreeding of B. insularis is the occurrence of "intersexes", individuals born with both a hemipenis and female reproductive parts. Duarte et al. attribute these intersexes to "a great amount of inbreeding" within the population (which is another effect of the species' small distribution) and explain that the relatively high occurrence of intersexes being born may be harmful to the species population, since most of the intersexes are sterile.

In addition to intersexes, it has been observed that when compared to their mainland relatives B. jaracara, B. insularis have reduced fecundity in females, and high levels of mutations in male sperm, thought to be a product of heavy inbreeding.

Loss of food sources 
As of 2019, it was reported by snake expert Bryan Fry, in an interview with 60 Minutes Australia that the migratory birds that B. insularis depends upon were visiting less due to deforestation on the Brazilian mainland.

Behavior
These snakes may be either terrestrial or arboreal, even though they lack a true prehensile tail. Observations suggest that the species' use of vegetation is facultative (optional) and that it is not truly arboreal. They are likely found to be in trees while hunting for their prey, which consists mostly of birds, but tend to seek shelter under leaf litter or in rock crevices during storms or after ingesting prey.

Unlike other venomous snakes that tend to strike, release, and then track their prey, B. insularis keeps its prey in its mouth once it has been envenomated. This is thought to be an adaptation to hunting birds, as chemical tracking of prey after release, a practice used by other vipers, is much harder when flying birds are to be tracked.

While other lanceheads have been observed shaking their tails in order to lure prey, this behavior has not been observed in the golden lancehead. However, considering the presence of potential prey susceptible to caudal luring and the opportunistic nature of B. insularis, it would not be surprising if this behavior were eventually observed.

References

Further reading 
 Amaral APG do. 1921 [1922]. Contribuição para conhecimento dos ofídios do Brasil – A. Parte II. Biologia da nova espécie, Lachesis insularis. Annexos das Memórias do Instituto Butantan 1: 39-44.

External links 
 

insularis
Endemic fauna of Brazil
Reptiles of Brazil
Snakes of South America
Venomous snakes
Critically endangered animals
Critically endangered biota of South America
Reptiles described in 1922
Taxonomy articles created by Polbot